The 1990–91 Segunda División B season was the 14th since its establishment. The first matches of the season were played on 1 September 1990, and the season ended in 23 June 1991 with the promotion play-off final games.

Overview before the season
80 teams joined the league, including four relegated from the 1989–90 Segunda División and 18 promoted from the 1989–90 Tercera División. The composition of the groups was determined by the Royal Spanish Football Federation, attending to geographical criteria.

Relegated from Segunda División
Racing Santander
Real Madrid Deportivo
Recreativo
Atlético Madrileño

Promoted from Tercera División

Compostela
Vetusta
Gimnástica Torrelavega
Alavés
Sant Andreu
Torrent
Móstoles
Palencia
Los Boliches
Fuengirola
Betis Deportivo
Manacor
Las Palmas Atlético
Yeclano
Extremadura
Izarra
Huesca
Valdepeñas

Group 1
Teams from Asturias, Castile and Leon, Galicia and Madrid.

Teams

League table

Results

Top goalscorers

Top goalkeepers

Group 2
Teams from Andorra, Aragon, Basque Country, Cantabria, Catalonia, Castile and Leon and Navarre.

Teams

League table

Results

Top goalscorers

Top goalkeepers

Group 3
Teams from Andalusia, Canary Islands, Castilla–La Mancha, Ceuta, Extremadura and Melilla.

Teams

League table

Results

Top goalscorers

Top goalkeepers

Group 4
Teams from Balearic Islands, Castilla–La Mancha, Catalonia, Region of Murcia and Valencian Community.

Teams

League table

Results

Top goalscorers

Top goalkeepers

 
Segunda División B seasons
3
Spain